Jake's Thing is a satirical novel written by Kingsley Amis, first published in 1978 by Hutchinson

Plot summary

The novel follows the life of Jacques 'Jake' Richardson, a 59-year-old Oxford don who struggles to overcome the loss of his libido.

Reception
In the magazine Prospect, critic Andrew Marr discussed his expectation that Amis' work would be retrospectively beyond the pale. "What slightly spoils this diatribe, however, is that to prepare for it I went back to Kingsley Amis’s novels and enjoyed myself more than was convenient for my purposes. Jake’s Thing, for instance, famously rancid with misogyny, turns out, on re-reading, to be surprisingly tender in parts, and intensely moving on the humiliations of impotence.  The Old Devils will last as long as novels do; but it is not the only brilliant treatment of old age-Ending Up is one of the most delicately tragic funny books I have ever read. And so on."

Writing in The Millions, critic Catherine Baab-Muguira acknowledged the novel's "comic brio."

References

External links
 Kingsley Amis "The Art of Fiction," The Paris Review

Further reading
 Bradford, Richard. Lucky Him: The Life of Kingsley Amis. London: Peter Owens, 2001. .

1978 British novels
Novels by Kingsley Amis
Novels set in Oxford
Hutchinson (publisher) books